Helmut Schlöske (27 June 1904 – 9 October 1944) was a German athlete. He competed in the men's long jump at the 1928 Summer Olympics. He was killed in action during World War II.

References

External links
 

1904 births
1944 deaths
Athletes (track and field) at the 1928 Summer Olympics
German male long jumpers
Olympic athletes of Germany
Place of birth missing
German military personnel killed in World War II